Shawn Bradstreet (born 28 February 1972) is an Australian cricketer. He played nine first-class and fifty List A matches for New South Wales between 1998/99 and 2004/05.

See also
 List of New South Wales representative cricketers

References

External links
 

1972 births
Living people
Australian cricketers
New South Wales cricketers
Sportspeople from Wollongong